Limonium otolepis, the saltmarsh sea lavender, lacy sea lavender or Asian sea lavender, is a species of flowering plant in the family Plumbaginaceae. It is native to Afghanistan, Central Asia, and Xinjiang and western Gansu in China. A halophyte, it is common in saline areas, such as the bed of the former Aral Sea. It has been introduced to California as a garden escapee, and is also present in southeastern Australia. There appears to be an ornamental cultivar, 'Lavender Lace'.

References

otolepis
Halophytes
Flora of Afghanistan
Flora of Central Asia
Flora of Xinjiang
Flora of North-Central China
Plants described in 1891